The 2010 All-Ireland Senior Ladies' Football Championship began on 31 July 2010.  were the winners, with a convincing win over Tyrone in the final.

Structure
Sixteen teams compete.
The top four teams from 2009 receive byes to the quarter-finals.
The quarter-finalists from 2009 receive byes to the second round.
The other eight teams play in the first round.
All games are knockout matches, drawn games being replayed.
The first-round losers playoff, with one team being relegated to the intermediate championship for 2011. Teams must spend two years as a senior team before they are eligible for relegation; teams that have not done so are exempt from relegation.

Fixtures and results

Early stages

Final stages

References

External links
Results and fixtures

!